The Extraordinary and Plenipotentiary Ambassador of Peru to the Republic of Chile is the official representative of the Republic of Peru to the Republic of Chile.

Both countries established relations in 1822 and maintained them in an amicable manner until the War of the Pacific in 1879, which was left a feeling of Anti-Chilean sentiment in the country since. This situation improved somewhat however after the signing of the 1929 Treaty of Lima, although a minor territorial dispute between both states remains to this day.

List of representatives

References

Chile
Peru